Minik is a Greenlandic Inuit name meaning "viscid train oil which is being used as sealing for skin boats." It was the third most popular name given to boys in Greenland during the past decade. The name was given to Prince Vincent of Denmark, born in 2011, as one of his middle names.

Notable people

Minik, later Minik Wallace (ca. 1890 – 1918), an Inuit brought to the United States of America from Greenland along with five other Inuit in 1897 by explorer Robert Peary.

Notes

Masculine given names